The England cricket team represents England and Wales in Test cricket. Since 2005, England has played 192 Test matches, resulting in 82 victories, 45 draws and 65 defeats. England faced Australia most frequently during this period—playing 45 matches against them.

Key

Matches

References

England in international cricket
England Test
Test